Đồng Đăng is a town of Cao Lộc District, Lạng Sơn Province, Vietnam. It is best known as a border town on the Vietnamese side of the main road and rail crossing to China. It is on National Route 1.

Đồng Đăng Railway Station and the town are several kilometres short of the Friendship Pass border crossing. It is one of three main border crossings with China, the others being Móng Cái-Dongxing, Guangxi to the East on the coast, and Lào Cai-Hekou, Yunnan, inland 150 km northwest. A fourth crossing is the Trà Lĩnh District-Longbang, Guangxi crossing.

History
The town was the site of the Battle of Đồng Đăng in 1885.

In September 1940 a group of Japanese officers, in spite of an agreement signed the 22nd, attacked Đồng Đăng and laid siege to Lam Sơn, beginning the Japanese invasion of French Indochina. In March 1945 the Japanese again attacked, and it was the site of the fiercest fighting of the March coup d'état, when a company of Tonkinese Rifles and a battery of colonial artillery held off the invaders for three days before being massacred by them.

In 1979, the border town became ground for heavy engagements between Chinese and Vietnamese forces during the Sino-Vietnamese War.

Geography
156 meters.

See also
Hanoi–Đồng Đăng Railway

References

China–Vietnam border crossings
Communes of Lạng Sơn province
Populated places in Lạng Sơn province
Townships in Vietnam